Tibiofibular ligament may refer to:

 Anterior tibiofibular ligament
 Interosseous membrane of leg, also known as middle tibiofibular ligament
 Posterior tibiofibular ligament